Pompton Lakes is a borough in Passaic County, in the U.S. state of New Jersey. As of the 2020 United States census, the borough's population was 11,127, an increase of 30 (+.3%) from the 2010 census count of 11,097, which in turn reflected an increase of 457 (+4.3%) from the 10,640 counted in the 2000 Census, which had in turn increased by 101 (+1.0%) from the 10,539 counted in the 1990 Census.

Pompton Lakes was established on February 26, 1895 from portions of Pompton Township, based on the results of a referendum held three days earlier. The borough was named for the Pompton people, a sub-tribe of Native Americans who lived in the area. It was the first borough to be formed in Passaic County as part of the "boroughitis" that had struck the state at the time. Pompton Lakes did not acquire territory from more than one township, which would have entitled the borough to a seat on the County's Board of Chosen Freeholders.

From the higher mountains in and around the borough one can see the New York skyline. Three rivers, the Ramapo, Pequannock and Wanaque, run through the borough, which historically provided much of the energy for various industries in the borough. In the mid-20th century, Pompton Lakes served as a local shopping destination, but lost its status as shopping malls opened in the area in the 1970s and 1980s.

History 
Dutch settlers began to settle in the area that is now Pompton Lakes in the 1680s, purchasing farmland from the local Lenape Native Americans.

The presence of iron ore and the availability of hydropower were initial catalysts for the early development of the Pompton area. An ironworks was constructed on the Pompton River in the early 1700s, which produced munitions for the French and Indian War, the Revolutionary War and the War of 1812.

Pompton was situated along the main north–south route during the Revolutionary War, and as such the Continental Army passed through often. Casparus Schuyler, a member of the prominent Schuyler family, owned a tavern in the town that became known as the Yellow Tavern or the Yellow Cottage, and the various army encampments in the area supplied much of the business.

General George Washington and his army stayed in the Pompton area twice during the course of the war, and he visited the Yellow Tavern both times. He first visited on July 11, 1777, when he met with local ironmaster Robert Erskine at the tavern. François-Jean de Chastellux, a major general in the French Expeditionary Force led by General Rochambeau, visited the Yellow Tavern on his way from Philadelphia to New England in December 1780, and remarked on his experience there in an account published later. Washington returned to the tavern on March 30, 1782, as he traveled north with his wife Martha. During this time, it was serving as the winter headquarters of Colonel Phillip Van Cortlandt. The tavern was torn down around 1900 to widen the adjacent road, and the site is noted by a historical marker.

Pompton Township was formed shortly after the Revolution, in 1797. During the Civil War, knives, saws, nails, and springs for railroad cars were manufactured at the Pompton Ironworks. The Morris Canal, completed in 1832, was linked to the town via the Pompton Feeder, which barges used to supply coal to blast furnaces. Despite this, Pompton remained predominantly rural through the 19th century, and various summer resorts around Pompton Lake served vacationing New Yorkers. The New York, Susquehanna and Western Railroad opened a local train station in the late 1870s, driving further development in the town. In 1895, Pompton Lakes voted to split from Pompton Township, and the borough was officially incorporated on February 26 of that year.

The population of Pompton Lakes increased during the early 1900s, due to the rapid growth of local employers like the German Artistic Weaving Company and the Smith Powder Works. The latter company was purchased in 1905 by E.I. du Pont de Nemours and Company and formed the basis of the DuPont Pompton Lakes Works, which operated in the borough until 1994.

In 1923, Dr. Joseph "Doc" Bier opened a "health farm" in Pompton Lakes, where boxers such as Pancho Villa and Jimmy McLarnin trained. In 1935, Joe Louis began training at the camp, and continued to use the camp until his retirement in 1949. He prepared for his famed bout with Max Schmeling there, and often invited local children to watch him practice. During his time in the borough he held boxing exhibitions at the camp to raise $2,600 for the purchase of an ambulance and an additional $2,000 to help build a police communications tower. The camp closed in the 1950s.

In 1938, Reaction Motors successfully designed and perfected the world's first regenerative cooling rocket at a basement laboratory in a building in downtown Pompton Lakes. The technology they invented made liquid-fueled rockets capable of burning for long enough periods to be practical, and all future liquid-fueled rockets would build off this technology. The company tested this rocket at Lake Inez in the borough, not far from the laboratory it was built in.

Decades-old industrial pollution and its connection to cancer and other illness among residents in a section of the borough was the subject of a week-long front-page investigative series in The Record newspaper in February 2018. The four-part series documented ground and water pollution that has impacted hundreds of homes surrounding a DuPont munitions plant that had operated for decades in the area, and the impact on the health of nearby residents exposed to the pollutants.

Geography 
According to the United States Census Bureau, the borough had a total area of 3.16 square miles (8.19 km2), including 2.89 square miles (7.48 km2) of land and 0.27 square miles (0.71 km2) of water (8.67%).

The borough borders the municipalities of Bloomingdale, Wanaque and Wayne in Passaic County; Oakland in Bergen County; and Riverdale and Pequannock in Morris County.

Much of the borough sits in a valley formed by the confluence of the Ramapo, Pequannock, and Wanaque rivers, which leads to common flooding events, the most recent of which was in 2011. A few taller hills ring the valley, including Federal Hill, which is notable as the site of the Pompton Mutiny, a revolt of Continental Army troops that occurred there on January 20, 1781, under the command of Colonel Israel Shreve.

Demographics

2010 census

The Census Bureau's 2006–2010 American Community Survey showed that (in 2010 inflation-adjusted dollars) median household income was $88,352 (with a margin of error of +/− $7,890) and the median family income was $97,074 (+/− $10,183). Males had a median income of $61,426 (+/− $7,225) versus $50,203 (+/− $4,456) for females. The per capita income for the borough was $35,872 (+/− $3,011). About 2.0% of families and 2.3% of the population were below the poverty line, including 1.7% of those under age 18 and 6.7% of those age 65 or over.

Same-sex couples headed 29 households in 2010, almost double the 15 counted in 2000.

2000 census
As of the 2000 United States census there were 10,640 people, 3,949 households, and 2,803 families residing in the borough. The population density was 3,585.7 people per square mile (1,383.2/km2). There were 4,024 housing units at an average density of 1,356.1 per square mile (523.1/km2). The racial makeup of the borough was 93.01% White, 1.21% African American, 0.19% Native American, 3.03% Asian, 0.01% Pacific Islander, 1.57% from other races, and 0.99% from two or more races. Hispanic or Latino of any race were 5.74% of the population.

There were 3,949 households, out of which 33.7% had children under the age of 18 living with them, 57.8% were married couples living together, 10.1% had a female householder with no husband present, and 29.0% were non-families. 23.8% of all households were made up of individuals, and 10.8% had someone living alone who was 65 years of age or older. The average household size was 2.69 and the average family size was 3.24.

In the borough the population was spread out, with 24.2% under the age of 18, 6.7% from 18 to 24, 33.0% from 25 to 44, 22.6% from 45 to 64, and 13.4% who were 65 years of age or older. The median age was 37 years. For every 100 females, there were 92.7 males. For every 100 females age 18 and over, there were 89.6 males.

The median income for a household in the borough was $65,648, and the median income for a family was $74,701. Males had a median income of $46,776 versus $38,221 for females. The per capita income for the borough was $26,802. About 1.6% of families and 3.2% of the population were below the poverty line, including 4.0% of those under age 18 and 6.1% of those age 65 or over.

Arts and culture
The 1997 comedy In & Out, starring Kevin Kline, Tom Selleck and Joan Cusack, was partially filmed at Pompton Lakes High School.

The 2014 independent short film Simpler Times, written and directed by Pompton Lakes native Steve Monarque and starring Jerry Stiller and Anne Meara, was filmed in downtown Pompton Lakes.

Parks and recreation
The southern portion of Ramapo Mountain State Forest lies within the northernmost area of Pompton Lakes, and the park's Cannonball Trail begins in the borough. There are also six municipal parks: Hershfield Park, Stiles Park, Gallo-Pacifico Park, Lakeside Park, Rotary Park, and John Murrin Park.

The Joe Louis Memorial features a granite monument dedicated to the boxer who lived and trained in the borough for a time.

Pompton Lakes and Riverdale share their youth sports teams. The Pompton Lakes-Riverdale Little League (PLRLL) runs youth tee-ball, baseball and softball leagues, while the Pompton Lakes-Riverdale Youth Organization (PLRYO) runs football, lacrosse and cheerleading, and the Pompton Lakes-Riverdale Soccer Association (PLRSA) runs the soccer teams. The Pompton Lakes Recreation Department also runs an annual summer day camp at Hershfield Park, as well as special programs including art classes and karate lessons.

Government

Local government

Pompton Lakes is governed under the borough form of New Jersey municipal government, which is used in 218 municipalities (of the 564) statewide, making it the most common form of government in New Jersey. The governing body is comprised of the Mayor and the Borough Council, with all positions elected at-large on a partisan basis as part of the November general election. The Mayor is elected directly by the voters to a four-year term of office. The Borough Council is comprised of six members elected to serve three-year terms on a staggered basis, with two seats coming up for election each year in a three-year cycle. The Borough form of government used by Pompton Lakes is a "weak mayor / strong council" government in which council members act as the legislative body with the mayor presiding at meetings and voting only in the event of a tie. The mayor can veto ordinances subject to an override by a two-thirds majority vote of the council. The mayor makes committee and liaison assignments for council members, and most appointments are made by the mayor with the advice and consent of the council.

, the Mayor of Pompton Lakes is Republican Michael A. Serra, whose term of office ends December 31, 2023. Members of the Borough Council are William D. Baig (R, 2025), Robert Cruz (R, 2024), Erik I. DeLine (R, 2024), Maria Kent (R, 2023), Jennifer Polidori (R, 2025), and Ekamon "Ek" Venin (R, 2023).

In July 2018, Jennifer Polidori was selected from a list of three candidates nominated by the Republican municipal committee to fill the seat expiring in December 2019 that had been held by Christian Baranco until he resigned from office earlier that month as he was moving out of the borough; Polidori served on an interim basis until the November 2018 general election, when voters selected a candidate to serve the balance of the term.

Federal, state, and county representation
Pompton Lakes is located in the 9th congressional district and is part of New Jersey's 40th state legislative district. 

Prior to the 2011 reapportionment following the 2010 Census, Pompton Lakes had been in the 26th state legislative district.

 

Passaic County is governed by Board of County Commissioners, comprised of seven members who are elected at-large to staggered three-year terms office on a partisan basis, with two or three seats coming up for election each year as part of the November general election in a three-year cycle. At a reorganization meeting held in January, the board selects a Director and Deputy Director from among its members to serve for a one-year term. 
, Passaic County's Commissioners are 
Director Bruce James (D, Clifton, term as commissioner ends December 31, 2023; term as director ends 2022),
Deputy Director Cassandra "Sandi" Lazzara (D, Little Falls, term as commissioner ends 2024; term as deputy director ends 2022),
John W. Bartlett (D, Wayne, 2024),
Theodore O. "T.J." Best Jr. (D, Paterson, 2023),
Terry Duffy (D, West Milford, 2022),
Nicolino Gallo (R, Totowa, 2024) and 
Pasquale "Pat" Lepore (D, Woodland Park, 2022).
Constitutional officers, elected on a countywide basis are
County Clerk Danielle Ireland-Imhof (D, Hawthorne, 2023),
Sheriff Richard H. Berdnik (D, Clifton, 2022) and 
Surrogate Zoila S. Cassanova (D, Wayne, 2026).

Politics
As of March 2011, there were a total of 7,357 registered voters in Pompton Lakes, of which 1,726 (23.5% vs. 31.0% countywide) were registered as Democrats, 2,006 (27.3% vs. 18.7%) were registered as Republicans and 3,623 (49.2% vs. 50.3%) were registered as Unaffiliated. There were 2 voters registered to other parties. Among the borough's 2010 Census population, 66.3% (vs. 53.2% in Passaic County) were registered to vote, including 85.2% of those ages 18 and over (vs. 70.8% countywide).

In the 2012 presidential election, Republican Mitt Romney received 49.6% of the vote (2,418 cast), ahead of Democrat Barack Obama with 49.1% (2,396 votes), and other candidates with 1.3% (63 votes), among the 4,923 ballots cast by the borough's 7,536 registered voters (46 ballots were spoiled), for a turnout of 65.3%. In the 2008 presidential election, Republican John McCain received 2,803 votes (50.6% vs. 37.7% countywide), ahead of Democrat Barack Obama with 2,567 votes (46.3% vs. 58.8%) and other candidates with 53 votes (1.0% vs. 0.8%), among the 5,541 ballots cast by the borough's 7,587 registered voters, for a turnout of 73.0% (vs. 70.4% in Passaic County). In the 2004 presidential election, Republican George W. Bush received 2,847 votes (53.9% vs. 42.7% countywide), ahead of Democrat John Kerry with 2,330 votes (44.1% vs. 53.9%) and other candidates with 45 votes (0.9% vs. 0.7%), among the 5,283 ballots cast by the borough's 7,217 registered voters, for a turnout of 73.2% (vs. 69.3% in the whole county).

In the 2013 gubernatorial election, Republican Chris Christie received 65.9% of the vote (1,968 cast), ahead of Democrat Barbara Buono with 33.0% (985 votes), and other candidates with 1.1% (34 votes), among the 3,030 ballots cast by the borough's 7,657 registered voters (43 ballots were spoiled), for a turnout of 39.6%. In the 2009 gubernatorial election, Republican Chris Christie received 1,848 votes (52.5% vs. 43.2% countywide), ahead of Democrat Jon Corzine with 1,389 votes (39.4% vs. 50.8%), Independent Chris Daggett with 196 votes (5.6% vs. 3.8%) and other candidates with 45 votes (1.3% vs. 0.9%), among the 3,523 ballots cast by the borough's 7,298 registered voters, yielding a 48.3% turnout (vs. 42.7% in the county).

Education

The Pompton Lakes School District serves students in kindergarten through twelfth grade. As of the 2020–21 school year, the district, comprised of four schools, had an enrollment of 1,755 students and 138.5 classroom teachers (on an FTE basis), for a student–teacher ratio of 12.7:1. Schools in the district (with 2020–21 enrollment data from the National Center for Education Statistics) are 
Lenox School with 352 students in grades K–5, 
Lincoln School with 331 students in grades Pre-K–5, 
Lakeside Middle School with 384 students in grades 6–8 and
Pompton Lakes High School with 679 students in grades 9–12. Students from Riverdale (in Morris County) attend the high school as part of a sending/receiving relationship with the Riverdale School District.

St. Mary's School was a Catholic school for pre-kindergarten through eighth grade students that operated under the supervision of the Roman Catholic Diocese of Paterson. Opened in 1951, the school was closed at the end of the 2019–2020 school year in the wake of a ballooning fiscal deficit.

Media
WGHT, a daytime-only station, is located in Pompton Lakes. Founded as WKER in 1964, the station ceased broadcasting on December 14, 2017 as ownership was transferred to the borough. The station resumed broadcasting in April 2019 and is temporarily simulcasting programming from WTBQ in Warwick, New York while local programs are being developed. The transmitting tower for William Paterson University's WPSC-FM is also located in the borough.

The Borough of Pompton Lakes runs Facebook, Twitter, and Instagram Accounts,  which is managed by Public Information Officer Michael Carelli. The Borough also runs a town informational channel named PLTV77, airing on Optimum cable channel 77.

Transportation

Roads and highways

Major roads through Pompton Lakes include Interstate 287 and Paterson-Hamburg Turnpike.

Public transportation
NJ Transit's 193, 194, and 197 routes stop at various points in the borough, with service to and from Port Authority Bus Terminal in Midtown Manhattan. Local service through Passaic and Bergen counties is offered on the 748 line.

In September 2012, as part of series of budget cuts, NJ Transit suspended service to Newark on the 75 line.

Notable people

People who were born in, residents of, or otherwise closely associated with Pompton Lakes include:

 Cat Bauer (born 1955), author of contemporary young adult novels
 Cecil B. DeMille (1881–1959), the most commercially successful director in film history, acknowledged as a founding father of cinema in the United States
 Larry Elgart (1922–2017), jazz bandleader who recorded the theme to the long-running dance show American Bandstand with his brother Les (see below)
 Les Elgart (1917–1995), trumpet player who recorded the theme to the long-running dance show American Bandstand with his brother Larry
 Scott Ellsworth (born 1927), radio personality, news presenter and actor
 Charlie Getty (born 1952), played 10 seasons in the NFL, mainly for the Kansas City Chiefs
Christine Terhune Herrick (1859–1944), author of housekeeping books; built a home in the borough she named The Outlook, where she lived for 13 years
 Marty Isenberg (born 1963), animation writer best known for his role as co-story editor on Beast Machines and Transformers: Animated
 Gary Jennings (1928–1999), author of historical fiction, including Aztec
 Lovell Lawrence Jr., (1915–1971), rocket scientist who developed the first rocket engine to break the sound barrier
 Joe Louis (1914–1981), boxer and heavyweight champion who lived and trained in Pompton Lakes for part of his career
 Wil Mara (born 1966), children's book author and novelist  
 Steve Monarque (born 1959), New York-based actor, director, writer and musician
 Twiggy Ramirez (born 1971), bassist and guitarist for Marilyn Manson
 Patty Shwartz (born 1961), United States federal judge of United States Court of Appeals for the Third Circuit
 Albert Payson Terhune (1872–1942), author of Lad, A Dog and other dog stories, which were adapted into a 1962 film
 Mary Virginia Terhune (1830–1922), author known by her pen name of Marion Harland; mother of local authors Christine Terhune Herrick and Albert Payson Terhune
 Ognjen Topic (born 1992), Muay Thai kickboxer
 Travis Tuck (1943–2002), metal sculptor known for his hand-crafted weather vanes of repoussé copper and bronze
 Arthur Vervaet (1913–1999), politician who served four terms in the New Jersey General Assembly
 Michael Weiner (1961–2013), Executive Director of the Major League Baseball Players Association from 2009 until his death in 2013
 John Wolters (1945–1997), drummer for Dr. Hook & the Medicine Show
 James Hart Wyld (1912–1953), engineer and rocket scientist who helped to found Reaction Motors; developed a cooling system that is the basis for all modern liquid-propelled rocket motors

References

External links

 Pompton Lakes Borough website
 Pompton Lakes School District
 
 School Data for the Pompton Lakes School District, National Center for Education Statistics
 Pompton Lakes Public Library

 
1895 establishments in New Jersey
Borough form of New Jersey government
Boroughs in Passaic County, New Jersey
Populated places established in 1895